Gonzalo García (born 9 June 1976) is an Argentine cyclist. He competed at the 1996 Summer Olympics and the 2000 Summer Olympics.

References

External links
 

1976 births
Living people
Argentine male cyclists
Olympic cyclists of Argentina
Cyclists at the 1996 Summer Olympics
Cyclists at the 2000 Summer Olympics
Place of birth missing (living people)
Pan American Games medalists in cycling
Pan American Games bronze medalists for Argentina
Medalists at the 1999 Pan American Games
Cyclists at the 1999 Pan American Games
20th-century Argentine people